Founderism (being a Founderist) is an intellectual outlook that has a strong "reverence for the founders" of the United States. The term is viewed as a pejorative epithet, accusing those so labeled as having a worldview that sacrifices historical accuracy for turning the "founding into a fetish".

The antonym "anti-founderism" is applied to those who "seem convinced that there was something profoundly wrong with the origins" of the state.

See also
 Founder's syndrome

References

Philosophy of law
Theories of law
Political philosophy
Philosophy of social science
Political theories